Majalgaon Assembly constituency is one of the 288 Vidhan Sabha (legislative assembly) constituencies of Maharashtra state in western India.

Majalgaon (constituency number 229) is one of the six Vidhan Sabha constituencies located in the Beed district. It covers the entire Dharur and Wadwani tehsils and part of Majalgaon tehsil of this district.

Majalgaon is part of the Beed Lok Sabha constituency along with all other Vidhan Sabha segments in this district, namely Georai, Parli, Beed, Ashti and Kaij.

Representatives
1972: Savalaram Nathu Tribhuwan INC
1978: Sundarrao Solanke INC
1980: Govindrao Sitaram Dak INC(U)
1985: Mohanrao Solanke, Indian Congress (Socialist)
1990 :Radhakrishna Hoke Patil INC
1995: Bajirao Jagtap , Independent 
1999: Prakashdada Solanke, BJP
 2004: Prakashdada Solanke, BJP
 2009: Prakashdada Solanke, NCP
 2014: R T (Jija) Deshmukh , BJP
 2019: Prakashdada Solanke, NCP

Election Result

Assembly Elections 2014

Assembly Elections 2019

See also
 Manjlegaon
 List of constituencies of Maharashtra Vidhan Sabha

References

Assembly constituencies of Maharashtra
Beed district